Lahijan Rural District is in Khosrowshah District of Tabriz County, East Azerbaijan province, Iran. At the National Census of 2006, its population was 14,052 in 3,713 households. There were 15,768 inhabitants in 4,607 households at the following census of 2011. At the most recent census of 2016, the population of the rural district was 16,290 in 5,017 households. The largest of its eight villages was Lahijan, with 5,430 people.

References 

Tabriz County

Rural Districts of East Azerbaijan Province

Populated places in East Azerbaijan Province

Populated places in Tabriz County